In classical mechanics, analytical dynamics, also known as classical dynamics or simply dynamics, is concerned with the relationship between motion of bodies and its causes, namely the forces acting on the bodies and the properties of the bodies, particularly mass and moment of inertia.   The foundation of modern-day dynamics is Newtonian mechanics and its reformulation as Lagrangian mechanics and Hamiltonian mechanics.

History
The field has a long and important history, as remarked by Hamilton:
"The theoretical development of the laws of motion of bodies is a problem of such interest and importance that it has engaged the attention of all the eminent mathematicians since the invention of the dynamics as a mathematical science by Galileo, and especially since the wonderful extension which was given to that science by Newton."  William Rowan Hamilton, 1834 (Transcribed in Classical Mechanics by J.R. Taylor, p. 237)

Some authors (for example, Taylor (2005) and Greenwood (1997)) include special relativity within classical dynamics.

Relationship to statics, kinetics, and kinematics
Historically, there were three branches of classical mechanics: 
"statics" (the study of equilibrium and its relation to forces)
"kinetics" (the study of motion and its relation to forces). 
"kinematics" (dealing with the implications of observed motions without regard for circumstances causing them).

These three subjects have been connected to dynamics in several ways. One approach combined statics and kinetics under the name dynamics, which became the branch dealing with determination of the motion of bodies resulting from the action of specified forces; another approach separated statics, and combined kinetics and kinematics under the rubric dynamics. This approach is common in engineering books on mechanics, and is still in widespread use among mechanicians.

Fundamental importance in engineering, diminishing emphasis in physics
Today, dynamics and kinematics continue to be considered the two pillars of classical mechanics.  Dynamics is still included in mechanical, aerospace, and other engineering curricula because of its importance in machine design, the design of land, sea, air and space vehicles and other applications. However, few modern physicists concern themselves with an independent treatment of "dynamics" or "kinematics," nevermind "statics" or "kinetics."  Instead, the entire undifferentiated subject is referred to as classical mechanics.  In fact, many undergraduate and graduate text books since mid-20th century on "classical mechanics" lack chapters titled "dynamics" or "kinematics."
In these books, although the word "dynamics" is used when acceleration is ascribed to a force, the word "kinetics" is never mentioned. However, clear exceptions exist. Prominent examples include The Feynman Lectures on Physics.

List of Fundamental Dynamics Principles
 Newton's laws of motion
 Inertia
 Acceleration
 Momentum
 Reaction
 Newton's law of universal gravitation
 Special theory of relativity

Axioms and mathematical treatments
 Variational principles and Lagrangian mechanics
 Hamiltonian mechanics
 Canonical transformations
 Hamilton–Jacobi Theory

Related engineering branches
 Particle dynamics
 Rigid body dynamics
 Deformation mechanics
 Fluid dynamics
 Hydrodynamics
 Gas dynamics
 Aerodynamics

Related subjects
 Statics

References

Dynamics (mechanics)
Classical mechanics